This is a list of members of the Swiss Federal Council, in chronological order and for any given year since inauguration of the Federal Council, from 1848 to present. Its seven members constitute the federal government of Switzerland and collectively serve as the country's head of state. Each of the seven Federal Councillors heads a department of the Swiss federal administration.

The members of the Federal Council are elected for a term of four years by both chambers of the federal parliament sitting together as the United Federal Assembly. Each Federal Councillor is elected individually by secret ballot by an absolute majority of votes. Once elected for a four-year-term, Federal Councillors can neither be voted out of office by a motion of no confidence nor can they be impeached. Reelection is possible for an indefinite number of terms. Parliament has decided not to reelect a sitting Federal Councillor only four times and only twice (in 2003 and 2007) since 1872. In practice, therefore, Federal Councillors serve until they decide to resign and retire to private life, usually after three to five terms of office.

Chronological, global

Timeline

Notes

References
 
 
 
 
 
 

Switzerland, Federal Council
Members of the Swiss Federal Council by date

de:Liste der Mitglieder des Schweizerischen Bundesrates
es:Anexo:Consejeros Federales de Suiza
eo:Listo de la federaciaj konsilantoj de Svislando
fr:Liste des conseillers fédéraux de Suisse
id:Daftar anggota Dewan Federal Swiss
it:Indice dei Consiglieri federali svizzeri
la:Index Consiliariorum Foederalium
nl:Lijst van leden van de Bondsraad
pt:Lista de membros do Conselho Federal suíço